Miss Europe 1930 was the third annual Miss Europe competition and second under French journalist Maurice de Waleffe. Miss Greece won and 19 girls from Europe competed in the pageant. Belgium participated for the first time and one candidacy, that of Switzerland, was withdrawn. Czechoslovakia and Turkey returned to the pageant, they haven't competed since 1927.

Results

Placements

Delegates

 - Ingeborg von Grinberger
 - Jenny Vanparays
 - Konika Tchobanova
 - Milada Dostálová
 - Esther Petersen
 - Marjorie Ross
 -  Yvette Labrousse
 - Dorit Nitykowski
 - Aliki Diplarakou

 - Rie Van der Rest
 - Maria Papst
 - Vera Curran
 - Mafalda Morittino
 - Zofia Batycka
 - Zoica Dona
 (In exile) - Irene Wentzel
 - Elena Plá Mompó
 - Mubedjel Namik
 - Stephanie "Caca" Drobujak

National pageant notes

Debuts
Belgium went to Miss Europe for the first time.

Withdrawals
Switzerland withdrew from the pageant.

Returns
Czechoslovakia and Turkey returned to the pageant. They both last competed in 1927.

References

External links

Miss Europe
1930 in Paris
Beauty pageants in France